Hólmavík Airport  is an airport serving Hólmavík, Iceland.

See also
Transport in Iceland
List of airports in Iceland

References

External links
 OurAirports - Hólmavík
 Hólmavík Airport
 OpenStreetMap - Hólmavík

Airports in Iceland